Heavens was an indie rock band featuring Matt Skiba of Alkaline Trio, and Josiah Steinbrick of F-Minus. The duo signed to Epitaph Records and released their debut album, Patent Pending, on September 12, 2006.

They spent the 2006 fall season playing the UK and select dates across the US with Darker My Love.

Discography

Studio albums
 Patent Pending (September 12, 2006)

Singles
"Patent Pending" (2006)

Videography
"Patent Pending" (2006)

Samples
"Patent Pending" at Epitaph.com
Heavens on MySpace

References

External links
Epitaph Artist Page
Heavens profile on Punknews.org
Patent Pending on Spin.com
Patent Pending Video

Musical groups established in 2006
Musical groups disestablished in 2008
Epitaph Records artists
American indie rock groups
American post-punk music groups
American electronic rock musical groups